Douglas Dean Hesse (born July 25, 1956) is an American professor of English and writer who has been elected leader president of three national literacy organizations: president of The National Council of Teachers of English (2016), chair of the Conference on College Composition and Communication (2005), and president of the Council of Writing Program Administrators (1998–2000). 

Hesse  graduated from DeWitt (Iowa) Central High School, which inducted him to its Hall of Fame in 2016. He received a BA in English from the University of Iowa in 1978; an MA/W (Converted to MFA in Nonfiction) from Iowa in 1980; and a PhD from Iowa in 1986, with a dissertation The Story in the Essay. He taught at Findlay College, 1980-1983; at Illinois State University 1986-2006 (where he directed the writing program, the graduate program in English, the Center for the Advancement of Teaching, and the University Honors Program); and then the University of Denver 2006-present, where he is Professor of English and Founding Executive director of the Writing Program. He publishes primarily in the areas of creative nonfiction, writing theory and pedagogy, and writing program organization and administration.

Books and Publications
Creating Nonfiction, co-author  with   Becky Bradway (Bedford/St. Martin's, 2009 )
Simon and Schuster Handbook for Writers (co-author with Lynn Troyka). 7th, 8th, 9th, 10, 11th ed, 2004–2017.
Over 80 essays, articles, and chapters, including in such journals as College English, College Composition and Communication, Research in the Teaching of English, Writing on the Edge, and many others.

Honors
University of Denver Distinguished Scholar. 2012.
Illinois State University Outstanding Researcher. 2002.
Visiting Research Professor.  Michigan Technological University.  June, 1996.
Wiepking Distinguished Visiting Professor of English.  Miami University, Oxford, OH.  2001-02.
Donald Murray Award for Nonfiction.
Young Rhetorician of the Year. 2015.
Phi Beta Kappa.

Leadership
Incoming Chair. Association for Writing Across the Curriculum (AWAC). 2022. (Chair 2023, Past Chair 2024)
President.  104th President of the National Council of Teachers of English . 2016. Vice President, 2014, President Elect, 2015. Past President 2017.
Co-Director, WPA Consultant Evaluator Service. 2010–2016.
Founder and Chair, NCTE/Norman Mailer Foundation National Student Awards for Writing, 2009-2015.
Chair (President), Conference on College Composition and Communication, 2005. At 7000+ members; nation’s largest organization of writing professors. Officer from 2002–2006.
Executive Committee.  National Council of Teachers of English.  2003-06.
President, National Council of Writing Program Administrators.  1999–2001.
Editor, WPA: Writing Program Administration, 1994-1998.
Chair, Executive Committee of MLA Division on Teaching as a Profession.  2007.

References

University of Denver faculty
Living people
Writers from Iowa
University of Iowa faculty
Illinois State University faculty
21st-century American male writers
1956 births